The Willie Marshall Award is given to the American Hockey League's leading goal scorer for the regular season. The award was established in the 2003–04 season to honor Willie Marshall, the AHL's all-time leader in goals, assists, points and games played. Marshall is also the AHL's all-time leader in post-season scoring.

Winners

Before the award
The following is a list of top goal scorers by season in the American Hockey League, prior to the institution of the Willie Marshall Award.

References

External links
Official AHL website
AHL Hall of Fame
Historic standings and statistics - at Internet Hockey Database

American Hockey League trophies and awards